Moore v. Harper is an ongoing United States Supreme Court case related to the independent state legislature theory (ISL), arising from the redistricting of North Carolina's districts by the North Carolina legislature following the 2020 census, which the state courts found to be too artificial and partisan, and an extreme case of gerrymandering in favor of the Republican Party.

Background 
North Carolina's congressional and legislative districts have been subject to protracted litigation over the 2010s and 2020s in both federal and state courts. In the 2019 decision in Rucho v. Common Cause, which arose out of district maps in North Carolina, the Supreme Court of the United States held that partisan gerrymandering claims are beyond the reach of federal courts, and that asking for judicial intervention would represent an expansion of powers.

Courts can still evaluate redistricting maps for racial gerrymandering under the Voting Rights Act. In 2017, the General Assembly modified state law to direct that the speaker of the North Carolina House of Representatives and the president pro tempore of the North Carolina Senate be able to intervene in any litigation over the constitutionality of state law. Following the 2020 United States census, the state gained an additional seat in the U.S. House of Representatives and required a redistricting of the state. The census also showed that the state demographics were about 60% Caucasian and the remaining from other racial backgrounds, with African Americans and Hispanics making up the largest percentages. The Republican-controlled legislature started drafting new maps that they claimed to be in line with a previous North Carolina Supreme Court ruling from 2019 that required the maps to be compliant with the Voting Rights Act to avoid racial gerrymandering, along with an open and transparent process to the voters of the state. State Senator Dan Blue, the state senate's Democratic leader, stated that the resulting maps gave an advantage to the Republican Party in ten seats to the Democrats in four. Multiple lawsuits were filed against the leaders of the North Carolina legislature in November 2021 on claims that the maps were both racially and partisan gerrymandered. 

Wake County Superior Court upheld the maps in January 2022. On the partisan gerrymandering, the court stated that in the lines of Rucho, "Were we as a court to insert ourselves in the manner requested, we would be usurping the political power and prerogatives of an equal branch of government." The court also said the plaintiffs had not shown sufficient evidence that the new maps were racially gerrymandered. On appeal, the North Carolina Supreme Court held the maps unconstitutional in a 4–3 decision given in February 2022. Under remand to the superior court, the General Assembly attempted to draw up new maps to comply with the Supreme Court decision, but these failed to satisfy the judges on the superior court. A special master team of outside experts were assigned to create a new map, which was accepted by the superior court on February 24, 2022.

On February 25, 2022, the General Assembly sought a stay for the newly drawn maps pending appeal by the U.S. Supreme Court, to allow for review of the Elections Clause issue. It was denied on March 7, 2022, over the dissent of Justice Samuel Alito, who was joined by Justices Neil Gorsuch and Clarence Thomas. Justice Brett Kavanaugh concurred, asserting the Purcell principle counseled against intervention so soon before the election.

Throughout the litigation, the General Assembly argued their case based on the independent state legislature theory (ISL). This theory is based on language from the Elections Clause in the Article One of the U.S. Constitution, stating: "The Times, Places and Manner of holding Elections for Senators and Representatives, shall be prescribed in each State by the Legislature thereof." The theory is based on the reading that Article I implies that only state legislatures may make any decisions related to election law and prevent any actions from courts or the executive branch from challenging it. This would allow the state legislature to fully control redistricting as well as other voting laws. While the Supreme Court and other courts had already rejected this concept, including as late as Smiley v. Holm (1932), the theory gained more traction with Republicans and conservatives since Bush v. Gore (2000), thus making it a potentially landmark case according to legal experts. ISL proponents also pointed to Bush v. Palm Beach County Canvassing Board (2000) in support of their arguments.

Supreme Court 
The North Carolina speaker of the House, president pro tempore of the Senate, and other members of the General Assembly subsequently filed a petition for a writ of certiorari. The Court granted review on June 30, 2022, to be heard in the October 2022–23 term.

Oral arguments were held December 7, 2022. Court observers stated that it appeared that the ISL theory argued by David H. Thompson was rejected by the three liberal justices (Sotomayor, Kagan, and Jackson) alongside Chief Justice Roberts and Justices Kavanaugh and Barrett. While Roberts looked to overturn the North Carolina Court decision, he sought to do it in a way that did not embrace ISL. Justices Alito, Thomas, and Gorsuch appeared to still embrace concepts of the ISL as to rule in favor of the state legislature.

The Court had agreed to hear the case in June 2022 at the request of North Carolina legislators after the state's Supreme Court, then with a 4-3 Democratic majority, set aside the new redistricting maps. In the November 2022 elections, Republicans gained a 5-2 majority on the state court, and in February 2023 they agreed to reconsider the prior court's ruling. In March 2023, the United States Supreme Court asked the involved parties to submit 10-page briefs within days to assess whether the state court's decision to rehear the case rendered the high court's consideration of the case moot, such that Moore might be dismissed.

Impact 
Moore v. Harper has been described as one of the most high-profile cases the Supreme Court has taken up in recent years; former federal judge Michael Luttig called it the "single most important case on American democracy — and for American democracy — in the nation's history". The case is expected to have a significant impact on future federal elections in the U.S. should the court support ISL, and affect efforts to make gerrymandering illegal or remove restrictions on voting. Three of the current justices — Alito, Gorsuch, and Thomas — had stated in the dissent to the Court's March 2022 order denial that they believed the state argued correctly on employing ISL. Should the court rule in the state's favor, the ruling would likely impact the 2024 United States elections.

See also 
 Arizona State Legislature v. Arizona Independent Redistricting Commission (2015)
 Texas v. Pennsylvania (2020)

References

Further reading

External links 
 

 Audio of oral argument, December 7, 2022

 Transcript of oral argument, December 7, 2022

2023 in United States case law
United States electoral redistricting case law
United States federalism case law
United States Supreme Court cases
United States Supreme Court cases of the Roberts Court